The history of Blackpool Football Club is described in two separate articles:

 History of Blackpool F.C. (1887–1962)
 History of Blackpool F.C. (1962–present)

For a general overview of the club's history, see Blackpool F.C.#History